Gajana is a village in the municipality of Vodnjan, in Istria, Croatia. In 2011 it had a population of 172.

References

Populated places in Istria County